The 2008–09 Tour de Ski was the third edition of the Tour de Ski and took place from 27 December 2008 until 4 January 2009. The race kicked off in Oberhof, Germany, and concluded with the Final Climb stage in Val di Fiemme, Italy. The tour was the first tour starting in Oberhof and the second starting in Germany. The men's event was 102 km, won by Dario Cologna of Switzerland; and the women's event was 60 km, won by Virpi Kuitunen of Finland.

Overall leadership

Final standings

Overall standings

Yevgeny Dementyev finished 9th but was later disqualified after he tested positive for recombinant erythropoietin (EPO).

Sprint standings
The sprint competition was contested during the sprint races and partly during the other races. According to the position in the race, the skiers achieved bonus seconds for sprints, and bonus points for intermediate points in mass start races.

Stages

Stage 1 
27 December 2008, Oberhof - Prologue, Individual start

Stage 2 
27 December 2008, Oberhof - Handicap Start

Stage 3 
29 December 2008, Prague - Sprint

Stage 4 
31 December 2008, Nové Město na Moravě - Individual start

Stage 5 
1 January 2009, Nové Město na Moravě - Sprint

Stage 6 
3 January 2009, Val di Fiemme, Italy - Mass start

Stage 7 
4 January 2009, Val di Fiemme - Pursuit

References

External links

Tour de Ski
2008 09
December 2008 sports events in Europe
January 2009 sports events in Europe
Tour de Ski 2007-08
Tour de Ski 2008-09